Kaki District is in Dashti County, Bushehr province, Iran. At the 2006 census, its population was 22,798 in 4,764 households. The following census in 2011 counted 23,157 people in 5,895 households. At the latest census in 2016, the district had 25,283 inhabitants living in 7,058 households.

References 

Districts of Bushehr Province
Populated places in Dashti County